Cymbella inelegans is a diatom species in the genus Cymbella. It is a fresh water diatom species found in the United States.

References 

Cymbellales
Flora of the United States
Species described in 1894